Alojz Baránik (born 13 June 1954) is a Slovak lawyer and politician. Since 2016, he has served as a Member of the National Council representing the Freedom and Solidarity (SaS) party.

Early life 
Baránik was born in Bratislava. In 1972 he enrolled to study law at the Charles University, but transferred to the Comenius University the following year, where he graduated in law. Following his graduation, Baránik worked as an in-house counsel for an industrial company in Bratislava for three years.

In 1982 he emigrated to Canada, where he worked as a taxi driver and real estate agent. In 1992 he returned to Czechoslovakia to take the role of the lead legal counsel for Central and Eastern Europe at the Digital Equipment Corporation. After the bankruptcy of the company in 1998, he returned to his home town in Bratislava and became an attorney.

Political career 
In the 2016 Slovak parliamentary election, Baránik was elected to the parliament on the list of the SaS party. He retained his seat in the 2020 Slovak parliamentary election. As an MP, he has entered numerous high-profile disputes with judges as well as the prosecutor general Maroš Žilinka.

References

1954 births
Living people
Slovak jurists
Freedom and Solidarity politicians
Politicians from Bratislava
Members of the National Council (Slovakia) 2020-present
Members of the National Council (Slovakia) 2016-2020
Comenius University alumni
Slovak emigrants to Canada